Legg House may refer to:

in the United States
(by state then city)
Legg House (Bloomington, Indiana), listed on the National Register of Historic Places (NRHP) in Monroe County
Legg's Dependence, Stevensville, Maryland, NRHP-listed
John Legg House, Worcester, Massachusetts, NRHP-listed
Harry F. Legg House, Minneapolis, Minnesota, NRHP-listed